Richard Collinson Inlet is a large inlet on the north side of Victoria Island, Northwest Territories, Canada. It opens into Viscount Melville Sound to the north. It is named after Richard Collinson, a Royal Navy officer and Arctic explorer. It should not be confused with the similarly named Collinson Inlet on King William Island.

References

Inlets of the Northwest Territories
Inlets of the Arctic Ocean
Victoria Island (Canada)